Brian Huskey (born September 8, 1968) is an American character actor, comedian, and writer. He is best known for his roles in comedy programs such as People of Earth, Childrens Hospital, Veep, and Another Period. He also provides the voice of Regular Sized Rudy on the animated comedy Bob's Burgers.

Early life and education
Huskey was born in Charlotte, North Carolina, and did not get to know his biological father until he was around age 15. He attended Charlotte Country Day School for the entirety of grade school and high school, graduating in 1987. He attended University of North Carolina at Greensboro, graduating with a degree in English and minor in photography. Around this time, he began to play bass guitar in the band Bicycle Face.

Huskey later relocated to New York City to attend phototography school and worked as a photographer's assistant. He met and was later roommates with Rob Corddry.

Career
Huskey studied and performed improvisational comedy during the start of the original Upright Citizens Brigade Theater (UCB) in New York City and had each of the "UCB4" (Matt Besser, Matt Walsh, Amy Poehler and Ian Roberts) as teachers. From there, he frequently appeared in comedy sketches on Late Night with Conan O'Brien for many years and was a panelist on VH1's Best Week Ever.

At UCB, Huskey was a member of the sketch comedy troupe The Naked Babies, with comedians Rob Corddry, Seth Morris and John Ross Bowie. He has since worked on Corddry's Adult Swim series Childrens Hospital, playing the role of Chet the creepy EMT worker, as well as alter ego Mark Splorn. Huskey also appeared as correspondent Duncan Birch on the IFC cable news satire Onion News Network.

Other programs in which Huskey co-starred include Damage Control and Free Radio. Huskey also appeared on the sitcoms Selfie and The Real O'Neals.

He made some notable early television appearances in a series of commercials opposite Molly Erdman in a campaign for Sonic Drive-In. Both actors would later be fired from this role as the result of an Onion News Network veterans parody he wrote and performed. Huskey has appeared in commercials for Wendy's, and, in 2011, "The Swagger Wagon" ad campaign for the Toyota Sienna. He has appeared in a campaign for Bai Brands alongside Justin Timberlake.

Huskey has also made many guest appearances on comedy programs including Community, Parks and Recreation, Nick Swardson's Pretend Time, Worst Week, Happy Endings, Animal Practice, The Inbetweeners, Workaholics, and Veep. He has appeared in films such as Superbad, Step Brothers, Semi-Pro, and Meet Dave.

He starred in the YouTube miniseries If Google Was A Guy on the YouTube channel CollegeHumor, acting as an anthropomorphic visualization of the search engine Google.

In 2014, Huskey co-wrote the film A Better You, with UCB co-founder Matt Walsh. Huskey starred in the film and Walsh directed.

He co-created, co-wrote and starred in his own Adult Swim television specials, Mr. Neighbor's House in 2016, and Mr. Neighbor's House 2 in 2018. The dark comic series is described as a David Lynch-esque kid's show that plays with the fragmentation of the title character's mind.

In 2020, he began co-hosting the podcast Bald Talk alongside Charlie Sanders, where they interview other fellow balding comedic actors. Huskey has also been a regular on many other comedic podcasts, including Comedy Bang! Bang!, Improv4Humans, and Womp It Up! where he plays the role of Seth Wompler.

Filmography

Film

Television

References

External links

Upright Citizens Brigade Theater profile

1968 births
American male film actors
American male comedians
American male television actors
American male voice actors
American television writers
American male television writers
Living people
Charlotte Country Day School alumni
University of North Carolina at Greensboro alumni
Male actors from North Carolina
Male actors from Charlotte, North Carolina
21st-century American male actors
20th-century American male actors
Upright Citizens Brigade Theater performers
Screenwriters from North Carolina
20th-century American comedians
21st-century American comedians